Hine is a surname deriving from Middle English.

Etymology

According to the Oxford Dictionary of Family Names in Britain and Ireland, the modern name Hine and its variants derive from the Middle English word hine (with the addition of the genitive -s case ending in forms like Hines, implying that the name-bearer was the child of a father called Hine, or addition of -s on the analogy of such names). This occupational name derives from Old English hīne ('household servant, farm labourer'), but in the Middle English period could also mean 'farm manager' and also be used of high-status people serving in a lordly household.

Distribution
Around 2011, there were 2899 bearers of the surname Hine in Great Britain and 21 in Ireland. In 1881, there were 2301 bearers of the name in Great Britain, concentrated in Devon.

People
Hine may refer to :

 Charles DeLano Hine (1867–1927), American civil engineer
 Deirdre Hine (born 1937), Welsh medical doctor
 Edward Hine (1825–1891), proponent of British Israelism in the 19th century
 George Thomas Hine, son of Thomas Chambers Hine, architect
 Lewis Hine (1874–1940), American sociologist
 Nicholas Hine, a character in the Sharpe novels of Bernard Cornwell
 Nick Hine (born 1966), British Royal Navy officer
 Milton B. Hine (1828–1881), American politician
 Reginald Hine (1883–1949), solicitor and historian
 Robert V. Hine (1921–2015), American historian
 Sonny Hine (1931–2000), American Hall of Fame Thoroughbred horse trainer
 Thomas Hine & Co., a manufacturer of cognac
 Thomas Chambers Hine (1813-1899), architect

See also 
 Hine E Hine, a Māori song
 Hine-nui-te-pō, a mythical Māori woman
 Ngāti Hine, a Māori tribe
 Hines (disambiguation)
 Hine (TV series), 1971 British television series

References